The State Register of Heritage Places is maintained by the Heritage Council of Western Australia. , 225 places are heritage-listed in the City of Busselton, of which 33 are on the State Register of Heritage Places.

List
The Western Australian State Register of Heritage Places, lists the following 33 state registered places within the City of Busselton:

 † Denotes structure or building has been demolished

References

Busselton
 
Busselton
heritage places in City of Busselton